Gitte Andersen may refer to:

 Gitte Andersen (footballer) (born 1977), Danish football defender
 Gitte Andersen (handballer) (born 1989), Danish handball player